Joseph Frantz Oscar Wergeland (17 November 1815 – 19 August 1895) was a Norwegian military officer, cartographer and skiing pioneer.

Personal life
Wergeland was born in Christianssand and grew up at Eidsvold. He was the son of priest and politician Nicolai Wergeland, and a brother of the poet Henrik Wergeland and feminist writer Camilla Collett. His cousin was military officer Harald Nicolai Storm Wergeland. In 1859 he returned to Christianssand, where he stayed the rest of his life.

Career

Wergeland became a military officer in 1834, a first lieutenant in 1839, lieutenant colonel in 1866, colonel in 1868, and major general in 1880.

Wergeland had many talents. He worked 11 years as a cartographer for the Norwegian Mapping and Cadastre Authority, where he drew the first official Norwegian county maps (the first issued was Christians Amt in 1845). He drew the first large and detailed map of Norway for use in schools. He was a teacher in drawing and calligraphy at the Norwegian Military Academy. He was orderly officer for the King. He was a member of the committee for the Hoved Line, Norway's first railway line, and several road constructions. As an eager sportsman and skier, he initiated military skiing divisions, and wrote a book about the history of skiing and its military applications. He is regarded as the founder of the sports clubs Christianssand ski- og skøyteklubb (1862) and Oddersjaa (1875).

A significant number of letters from the Wergeland family is preserved, largely due to Oscar, who kept the letters  he received from other family members.  He had a good relationship with his sister Camilla, and her articles from travels to European cities inspired his landscape work in Christianssand, as he constructed the Wergeland park and the Ravnedalen park, planted Baneheia (former grazing land) with trees by use of soldiers, and transformed several main roads into large avenues. The Wergeland Park was constructed in 1859–60. It is surrounded by many old and important buildings, such as the Cathedral (1696/1737/1885), Latinskolen (1736/1855) and the City Hall (1864).

The Ravnedalen Park was constructed in the 1870s as a romantic garden, in a valley with dramatic cliffs, waterfalls and lake. It has open areas for public arrangements like concerts, gatherings and festivals.

Statue
Gustav Lærum's bronze statue of Wergeland in Ravnedalen Park (above) was unveiled in 1917.

Books
Skiløbingen, dens historie og krigsanvendelse (1865)

Honours and awards
   Sweden-Norway:
 Commander of the Royal Order of the Sword, 1st Class, 7 September 1875; Commander Grand Cross, 19 July 1891
 Commander of the Royal Norwegian Order of Saint Olav, 1st Class, 21 January 1879
 : Grand Cross of the Order of the Dannebrog
 : Grand Officer of the Order of the Crown of Italy

References

External links 
 The family tree of Joseph Frantz Oscar Wergeland on Geni.com

1815 births
1895 deaths
Norwegian Army generals
People from Kristiansand
Academic staff of the Norwegian Military Academy
Wergeland family
Commanders Grand Cross of the Order of the Sword
Grand Crosses of the Order of the Dannebrog
Recipients of the Order of the Crown (Italy)